Jules Charles Victurnien de Noailles, 7th Duke of Noailles (12 October 1826 – 6 March 1895), was the son of Paul, 6th duc de Noailles, and who acceded to the title of duc de Noailles upon his father's death in 1885. He was succeeded by his son, Adrien de Noailles.  His fourth son, Mathieu Fernand Frédéric Pascal de Noailles, Count, married the writer Princess Anna Elisabeth Bibesco-Bassaraba de Brancovan, Countess.

Jules-Charles-Victurnien
Jules-Charles-Victurnien
Jules-Charles-Victurnien
Noailles, Jules-Charles-Victurien, 7th duc de
Noailles, Jules-Charles-Victurien, 7th duc de